Roosevelt "Rosey" Taylor (July 4, 1937May 29, 2020) was an American professional football player who was a safety for the Chicago Bears, San Francisco 49ers, and Washington Redskins of the National Football League (NFL). He played college football at Grambling State University. Part of Grambling's initial SWAC championship defense in 1960 – the group included four future All-Pros – Taylor went on to lead the NFL with nine interceptions in 1963, on the way to 32 career picks.

Taylor was a key defensive player on the 1963 Bears NFL championship team, during which he led the Bears in interceptions with 9 and in kick returns. The Bears defense that year was coached by future Pro Football Hall of Fame inductee George Allen. In 1968, he scored a 96-yard interception return. Twice selected to the Pro Bowl, Taylor never missed a game in nearly nine seasons with the Bears and later appeared in Super Bowl VII with the Redskins, with Allen as head coach. In 2019, to celebrate the team's centennial season, Taylor was named the 56th-greatest player in Bears history by Don Pierson and Dan Pompei.

In 2010, Taylor was inducted as a member of the Grambling State University Hall of Fame. He is a member of the Greater New Orleans Sports Hall of Fame. He was an all-city football player at Joseph S. Clark Sr. High School in New Orleans, Louisiana.

Taylor died on May 29, 2020 at the age of 82.

References

1937 births
2020 deaths
American football safeties
Chicago Bears players
San Francisco 49ers players
Washington Redskins players
Western Conference Pro Bowl players
Grambling State Tigers football players
Players of American football from New Orleans